Nina Morozova (Cyrillic: Нина Морозова; née Argunova; born 15 September 1989) is a Russian athlete specialising in the sprint hurdles. She won a silver medal at the 2015 Summer Universiade.

She has personal bests of 12.82 seconds in the 100 metres hurdles (-1.5 m/s, Adler 2015) and 8.05 seconds in the 60 metres hurdles (Prague 2015).

She studied at the Russian State University of Physical Education, Sport, Youth and Tourism.

International competitions

Personal bests
Outdoor
200 metres – 23.41 (-0.5 m/s) (Sochi 2011)
100 metres hurdles – 12.82 (-1.5 m/s) (Adler 2015)
Indoor
200 metres – 23.88 (Moscow 2013)
60 metres hurdles – 8.05 (Prague 2015)

References

1989 births
Living people
Russian female hurdlers
Universiade medalists in athletics (track and field)
Universiade silver medalists for Russia
Competitors at the 2011 Summer Universiade
Competitors at the 2013 Summer Universiade
Medalists at the 2015 Summer Universiade
World Athletics Championships athletes for Russia
Russian Athletics Championships winners